is a railway station on the Hachinohe Line in the town of Hashikami, Sannohe District, Aomori Prefecture, Japan. It is operated by the East Japan Railway Company (JR East).

Lines
Ōja Station is served by the Hachinohe Line, and is 25.8 kilometers from the terminus of the line at Hachinohe Station.

Station layout
The station has a single ground-level side platform serving one bi-directional track. There is a small rain shelter built on the platform, but there is no station building. The station is unattended.

History
The station opened on December 10, 1956. With the privatization of Japanese National Railways (JNR) on April 1, 1987, it came under the operational control of JR East.

Surrounding area
 Ōja fishing port

See also
 List of Railway Stations in Japan

External links

 

Railway stations in Aomori Prefecture
Hashikami, Aomori
Hachinohe Line
Railway stations in Japan opened in 1956
Stations of East Japan Railway Company